The Celts is a 2000 television documentary series produced by Opus Television for the Welsh channel S4C. A book adaptation of the same name by John Davies was published in the same year by Cassell & Co. Also in that year, the programme was sold to the American cable network Celtic Vision.

Synopsis 
The series examines who the Celts were, where they came from and what made their culture distinctive from other European peoples; with dramatizations of major historical events and visits to modern Celtic lands.

Episodes 
 "In the Beginning": Tracing the origin of the Celts.
 "Heroes in Defeat": Examining La Tène era, heyday of the Celtic culture.
 "The Sacred Groves": Looking at ancient Celtic religion, especially Druidism.
 "From Camelot to Christ": This episode claims that, after the collapse of the Roman Empire, Vortigern, King of the Britons, invited the Anglo-Saxons into Britain to help fight the Picts. Christianity was established during the Anglo-Saxon era.
 "Legend and Reality": From the 8th century onwards Celtic lands were invaded by the Vikings and then the Normans. Following the 16th-century Protestant Reformation, Celtic communities in Wales, Ireland and Brittany were marginalized in the push for political and religious unity.
 "A Dead Song?": Examining the meaning and threats to the Celtic identity. The struggle to define an identity still continues today.

DVD 
The series has been released on DVD by Kultur International Films in 2010.

See also 
 Celtic art
 Celtic Christianity
 Celtic languages
 Celtic mythology
 The Celts: First Masters of Europe

References

External links 
 

2000 British television series debuts
2000s British television miniseries
2000s British documentary television series
2000s Welsh television series
English-language television shows
S4C original programming
Celtic studies